Combo Rangers is a series of webcomics created in 1998 by Japanese-Brazilian author Fábio Yabu. It is based on Japanese manga and the Super Sentai series. It started off as a parody, then developed more serious storylines that still included comedy. It features five main rangers (red, blue, green, pink and yellow) as well as an extra white one. They are led by O Poderoso Combo (The Mighty Combo, whom the Rangers call Tio Combo, or Uncle Combo in English), and fight against several forms of evil. Combo Rangers has won the HQ Mix Award three times.

Synopsis 
The story is set in a fictional city called Cidade City ("City City") which is located in a fictional universe called "Yabuverso" ("Yabuverse"). Initially, Poderoso Combo was responsible for saving the city and the world from various sorts of evil, but his powers were harming his health and he was forced to retire. Therefore, he recruited five kids, all about nine years old, to battle against General Monte, a threat coming from space. The passage of time in the story matches time passing in the real world, so as the story advances, all the characters grew up. In the last season, they were featured as teenagers. Beyond being superheroes, they also had to balance school, home, and family, while trying to keep their superhero lives a secret. They are also members of ASH, the Association of Super Heroes (Associação de Super-Heróis) which is home to several other superheroes.

Development
The series was featured online until 2003, when it was cancelled. It was also printed as comics. There was a 3-issue miniseries printed by Editora JBC in 2000, a 12-issue series printed by the same company, and a 10-issue series printed by Panini Comics. In 2004, Yabu decided to stop writing the comic, in order to focus solely on his book "Princesas do Mar" (Sea Princesses). The book has been a success and Yabu has since released two sequels.

In December 2012, Yabu ran a crowdfunding project on the website  to release a new Combo Rangers story as a graphic novel. The funding was successful and the book was released in Brazil in 2013. It was followed by two sequel books, the latter of which had a crowdfunding campaign launched for it in 2017.

References

External links 
 Yabu's official blog

Further reading
 

Anime and manga inspired webcomics
Doujinshi
Comic book digests
Brazilian comics titles
Brazilian webcomics
1998 webcomic debuts
2005 webcomic endings
Parody webcomics
Satirical comics
Brazilian graphic novels
Coming-of-age webcomics
Superhero webcomics
Webcomics in print